The diplomatic emblem of France is an unofficial emblem that was adopted in 1913 by the French Foreign Ministry as a symbol for use by French diplomatic missions and consular posts abroad. It was based on an earlier design by the sculptor Jules-Clément Chaplain. The emblem also appears on the cover of French passports.

Description
The emblem consists of:
A wide pelte shield with, on the one end, a lion-head and, on the other end, an eagle-head. The shield bears the monogram 'RF', which stands for République Française (French Republic).
An olive branch, which symbolises peace.
An oak branch, which symbolises perennity or wisdom.
The fasces symbol, which is associated with the exercise of justice (the bundle of rods and an axe were carried by lictors in Ancient Rome) and the republic. This use of the fasces predates the adoption of this symbol by Benito Mussolini as the emblem of Italian Fascism.

Usage
The emblem appears on plaques and signs at French diplomatic missions, as well as on the cover of French passports and some other documents. In addition, a variation of the emblem is used as a symbol of the presidency of the French Republic.

References

See also

Armorial of France
National emblem of France
National symbols of France

National symbols of France
Foreign relations of France